Ron Burch is an American writer whose work spans television, film, plays, short fiction and novels. His movies include Head over Heels, Yours, Mine and Ours and Ferdinand. He was the executive producer/showrunner (along with David Kidd) of the DreamWorks Animation TV show Dinotrux. He and Kidd wrote the second, third, and fourth seasons of "Marvel Super Hero Adventures".

Early life 
Ron Burch was born in Columbus, Ohio. His family later moved to Sunbury, Ohio. He attended Ohio State University, Antioch University Los Angeles, and the Institute for Advanced Theater Training at Harvard University.

Hollywood 
While living in New York City, Ron and his writing partner, David Kidd, began writing together. They relocated to Los Angeles, where they worked as Staff Writers on the Tom Selleck sitcom "The Closer" for CBS. In 1998, they, along with composer Ed Alton, were nominated for an Emmy for "Outstanding Music and Lyrics" for the song "You Don't Know Jack." After that show, they transitioned to film where they worked uncredited on a number of movies and received screen credit on three of them: "Ferdinand," "Head Over Heels" and "Yours, Mine and Ours." He currently is Executive Producer on DreamWorks Animation TV's "Dinotrux." In addition to Ferdinand being nominated for an Academy Award, the Annie Award, the Golden Globe Award and several others, Ron, along with his co-writers, won the "Humanitas Award" for "Feature--Family."

Fiction 
Ron's fiction has appeared in a number of literary journals and anthologies. He's been nominated for a Pushcart Prize for his story "The Flower Pot" in Juked, Issue 6, February 1, 2009. His experimental novel, BLISS INC, was published by BlazeVox Books in 2010. His story "I Need" appeared in the anthology TOO MUCH:  Tales of Excess (Chuck Howe and Bud Smith, editors)

Plays 
Ron is also an award-winning playwright. His plays have been developed and produced by a variety of theatres in the US and internationally. His 10-minute play, "The Baby," is in THE BEST 10-MINUTE PLAYS, 2011 (Smith and Kraus) and his 10-minute play, "The Origin of Lewis Hackett," is in THE BEST 10-MINUTE PLAYS, 2014 (Smith and Kraus) and his 10-minute play, "Romeo and Jules," appears in the BEST OF PLAYGROUND 2013: LOS ANGELES. His 10-minute play, "Polly," was in THE BEST 10-MINUTE PLAYS, 2015 (Smith and Kraus).

Affiliations 
Ron is a member of the Dramatists Guild of America, Writers Guild of America West, ASCAP, the Alliance of Los Angeles Playwrights, the 2014-15 PlayGround LA Writers Pool and one of the Associate Directors of the Skylight Theatre's PlayLabs in Los Angeles, CA.

References 

Year of birth missing (living people)
Living people
20th-century American novelists
21st-century American novelists
American male novelists
American male screenwriters
Animation screenwriters
Showrunners
American television writers
DreamWorks Animation people
Television producers from Ohio
Ohio State University alumni
Writers from Columbus, Ohio
American male television writers
American male dramatists and playwrights
20th-century American dramatists and playwrights
Institute for Advanced Theater Training, Harvard University alumni
20th-century American male writers
21st-century American male writers
Novelists from Ohio
People from Sunbury, Ohio
Screenwriters from Ohio